Guiqiong is a poorly attested Qiangic language of Sichuan and Tibet. There are differences in the phonology of the dialects, but communication is possible. Two or three varieties have low mutual intelligibility with the rest.

It may be the same language as Sötati-pö in early editions of Ethnologue.

Sun (1991) documents Guiqiong of Maiben Township 麦本乡, Yutong District 鱼通区, Kangding County 康定县, Sichuan (Sun 1991:227).

The Qiangic languages are split into two language clusters. Guiqiong is categorized into a specific Qiangic cluster based on its vocabulary. This Qiangic language cluster also includes Zhaba, Queya, Ersu, Shixing, and Namuzi.

Outside their villages, speakers communicate utilizing the Chinese language. Guiqiong is heavily influenced by the Chinese language, as it contains many loanwords.

The Guiqiong language utilizes four tones and has no written script. Although Guiqiong lacks a written script, it has been able to successfully transcend from generation to generally orally.

The language has no presence in media today.

General Information

Population of Speakers
The population of speakers of this language for a long time have only been estimates. It has been difficult to provide an accurate count of how many exist because since the People's Republic of China was founded, the government has considered the Guiqiong people to be a part of the Tibetan minority. Because of this, the national census cannot provide an official count of the Guiqiong people.

Location
The general location of Guiqiong speakers is confined to a very small rectangular area. This area stretches 20 kilometers from its northern boundary to the southern boundary, and just reaches about 1 kilometer from its eastern to its western boundary. The area is situated to the west of the well-known Sichuan Province in China.

Jiang (2015: 2) reports that Guiqiong is spoken in the townships of Maibeng, Shelian, Qianxi, Guzan, Lan'an, and Pengba. Jiang's (2015) data is mostly from Guzan Township.

Most groups who speak languages that are part of the Qiangic subgroup of Tibeto-Burman are classified as members of the Tibetan national minority and live in western Sichuan province. Speakers of Guiqiong live in small communities that are intertwined among larger Chinese communities. They are distributed along the terraces of the Dadu River Yuton District, Kangding County of the Ganzi Autonomous Prefecture of the Tibetan Nationality, Sichuan.

Name of the language

Guiqiong is known by many different names, some that the Guiqiong people use to refer to themselves and their language, and some that others use to refer to the Guiqiong people and their language.

Phonology 
 Older speakers retain the distinction between the alveolo-palatal and retroflex series; younger speakers do not.
 Older speakers retain the distinction between the velar and uvular series; younger speakers have both series in free variation.
 The zero-initial is realized as [÷]. 
 In clusters,
 The language has a very complex initial consonant system.
 The following table is the phonological consonant inventory of Guiqiong.

Vowels 
Guiqiong distinguishes eight different vowel qualities.

Nasalization and diphthongs are also used to distinguish words.

See also
Guiqiong word list (Wiktionary)

References

Further reading
Sun Hongkai et al. 1991. Zangmianyu yuyin he cihui 藏缅语音和词汇 [Tibeto-Burman phonology and lexicon]. Chinese Social Sciences Press.
Ju Namkung. 1996. Phonological Inventories of Tibeto-Burman Languages. (STEDT Monograph Series, 3.) In Ju Namkung (ed.) Berkeley: Center for Southeast Asia Studies. xxvii+507pp.
Lì, Jiāng. 2015. A Grammar of Guìqióng: A language of Sichuan. (Languages of the Greater Himalayan Region, 5/15.) Leiden: Brill. xiii+452pp.
Lì, Jiāng. 2014. A Grammar of Guìqióng. University of Bern. 341pp. (Doctoral dissertation).
Sun, Hongkai. 1985. Liujiang liuyu de minzu yuyan ji qi xishu fen lei. Minzu Xuebao 3. 98-274.
Sun, Hongkai. 1990. Languages of the Ethnic Corridor in Western Sichuan. Linguistics of the Tibeto-Burman Area 13. 1-31.
Song, Lingli [宋伶俐]. 2011. A study of Guiqiong [贵琼语研究]. Beijing: Ethnic Publishing House [民族出版社].

External links
 Guiqiong at the Endangered Languages Project 
 Chinese Documentary on Guiqiong People

Qiangic languages
Languages of China